Candidate of Philosophy can refer to the US degree or status of Candidate in Philosophy (C.Phil. or Ph.C.) granted to Ph.D. students who have been accepted as candidates for that degree, or (as a direct translation) to degrees or former degrees at bachelor's or master's level from some Scandinavian countries.

United States 

In the United States, it is normal for graduate students working toward a doctorate to take coursework followed by examinations (known variously as candidacy examinations, comprehensive examinations or qualifiers) after which they become candidates for the doctorate. At a few institutions, this status is officially recognized either by a degree or some other official title. This is normally intended to be an interim status, prior to the award of a doctorate, not to be confused with the terminal master's degree awarded by some programs to those who leave after their candidacy examination. Some universities grant a Master of Philosophy degree to students who have been accepted for candidacy.

University of California
Seven of the ten University of California campuses offer the Candidate in Philosophy (C.Phil.) degree to those who have passed the candidacy exam for the PhD in some programs. On some campuses it is only awarded to those leaving without a master's or a doctorate.
University of California, Berkeley
University of California, Davis
University of California, Los Angeles
University of California, Riverside
University of California, San Diego
University of California, San Francisco
University of California, Santa Barbara

University of Washington
The University of Washington awards a certificate of Candidate in Philosophy (Ph.C.) to those admitted to candidacy for the Ph.D., alongside the Candidate in Education (Ed.C.) and Candidate in Musical Arts (C.M.A.) for those admitted to candidacy for the degrees of Doctor of Education (Ed.D.) and Doctor of Musical Arts (D.M.A.). These are designations for candidate status rather than degrees.

Scandinavia

Denmark
The candidatus/candidata philosophiae degree (cand.phil.) was a master's-level first degree. It was awarded after four years' study and included a dissertation. As part of Bologna Process of degree reforms, it was abandoned in 1995/6.

Sweden
In Sweden, :sv:filosofie kandidat (fil.kand. or FK) is the title for the holder of a bachelor's degree (filosofie kandidatexamen).

Finland
In Finland,  the filosofian kandidaatti (fil.kand. or FK) was a graduate degree awarded until 1994. Holders can proceed to a Master of Arts degree without further examination.

See also
 Candidate of Sciences, a degree granted by universities in some former Soviet Union countries that is similar in name but equivalent to a completed doctoral degree.

References

Bibliography

Doctoral degrees